VBS.tv was an online television network owned by Vice Media, and later absorbed into VICE.com. The network produced original, short-form, documentary-style video content under the auspice of VICE Films. Subject matter included humanitarian issues, music, insider travel guides, and news. The creative director of the network was Spike Jonze.

History

Formation
VBS began as a deal between Viacom-owned MTV Networks and Logo Group. In March 2007, the network was formed; MTV funded the formation of the network, and Vice magazine would supply the content. MTV has rights to distribute VBS content across its worldwide network of channels. According to Vice co-founder Suroosh Alvi, "traditional journalism always aspires to objectivity, and since day one with the magazine we never believed in that...Our ethos is subjectivity with real substantiation. I don't think you see that on CNN."

Circulation
VBS videos are available via the network's website, as well as being broadcast on MTV Latin America and MTV2. VBS is currently featured as a weekly show on MTV2. VBS.tv content has appeared in CNN as part of their CNN presents line-up, with CNN stating that "... We believe this unique reporting approach is worthy of sharing with our CNN.com readers." Much of it is now available at VICE.com.

Content
The network's videos feature reporting on popular culture, travel, extreme sports, and music. The site has also produced special-interest and current affairs-based shows such as an interview with Hezbollah's self-proclaimed mayor of Beirut and a show that explored allegations of environmental abuse. It has also approached drug issues, producing a documentary about the criminal use of the drug scopolamine in Colombia, a report on cocaine smuggling submarines and a documentary on hallucinogenic frogs in the Amazon rainforest. Other coverage includes a series of short documentaries about Darfur, Hurricane Katrina, Liberia, North Korea and suicide in Japan's Aokigahara Forest. The network also produced Heavy Metal in Baghdad, a feature-length documentary film about Acrassicauda. The director of content of the network was Santiago Stelley.

Filmography

References

External links
 Official VBS.tv website

Vice Media
American entertainment websites
Entertainment companies based in New York City
American companies established in 2007
Internet properties established in 2007
Paramount Media Networks
.